Effie Maud Aldrich Morrison  (January 2, 1876 – March 29, 1957) was a jeweler in Millville, New Jersey. She originated the concept and instigated the plan of the first senior housing project in the United States, which consisted of 14 homes. She was a deputy director of the Cumberland County Welfare Board in New Jersey. Morrison received several awards for her work designing retirement communities.

Early life 
Morrison was born at Monson, Massachusetts, on January 2, 1876. Her parents were Henry Edward Aldrich and his second wife Sarah Elizabeth (Lamphear) Aldrich. She had two brothers: Louis Edward Aldrich (18711954) and Harry Earl Aldrich (18801970), and three half-brothers; Charles Frederick, George Henry and Rufus Leland Aldrich.

Mid life 
Morrison married Carl Viets Griffin in Massachusetts when she was about 21 years old in 1897. They had one son, Carl Henry Griffin. They moved to Philadelphia sometime around 1905. Morrison's husband was employed as an advertising agent and worked in the Drexel Building. The two were divorced in December 1914. Morrison remarried in Philadelphia  the following year to Edward Carlton Morrison when she was 39 years old and her new husband was 23 years old. In 1916 they moved to Millville, New Jersey and the next year her husband, a self-employed merchant, was drafted in service for World War I. After the war Edward had a jewelry business at 22 High Street in Millville.

Morrison and her family lived at 214 North Second Street in Millville in 1921. Her husband Edward had adopted her son, becoming known as C. Henry Morrison Sr. and he married Doris Fox on April 23, 1925. In 1924 Morrison and her husband opened the new business as jewelers at the Morrison Building at 100 High Street in downtown Millville. They show in the 1924 Millville City Directory as living at 214 North Second Street. By 1928 Morrison she had separated from Edward and was running this new jewelry business with her son Henry and they show in the 1928 Millville City Directory as Diamond Setters, Jewelers, Watchmakers and Engravers. In May 1931 Morrison and her son filed for bankruptcy.

Roosevelt Park 

Morrison was the deputy director of the Cumberland County Welfare Board in 1932, where she developed a concept for a "colony for senior citizens". Morrison contacted several people to transform the concept into a policy and then worked on its implementation in reality. Morrison first conveyed the idea to New Jersey Governor Arthur Harry Moore, who forwarded the concept to Leon Henderson. He was a Millville native and an economic advisor in the Roosevelt administration. The concept was added to the Works Progress Administration (WPA) as the first senior housing project in the United States. The WPA spent $30,000 to build the 14 houses before it turned them over to the town of Millvill, which had donated  of land for the venture. As part of the turnover, Millville agreed to keep the houses in good repair and served as the landlord.

The retirement colony was built on land the town of Millville had repossessed for back taxes and became known as the "Roosevelt Colony". It was later renamed to the "Roosevelt Park" old age colony and was sometimes referred to as the Colony for the Aged at Roosevelt Park and Roosevelt Park Colony for Aged. When it opened on October 23, 1936, it became the first senior citizens' retirement colony in the United States. The colony consisted of 14 houses, each named after a flower, on lots . The houses were in a large square which had graded streets and sidewalks. There was a central community house for social activities within the project square with a resident colonist as a manager and caretaker. The community house had a fireplace, an assembly room, and game rooms.

Each of the 14 white cottage-style houses at Roosevelt Park had a living room, a bedroom and a bathroom. Seven houses for married people rented for $7 per month. There were seven slightly smaller houses designed for single people that rented for $5 per month, which included water and electricity. The houses were designed with the elderly in mind so that housekeeping chores would be minimized, and each came with a vegetable or flower garden. Residents received $15 monthly from the state under the Old Age Assistance Act that established the "old-age assistance" program in 1932. Morrison's experiment in old age living was a successful project and expanded to 33 homes with 50 people by 1952 and she became its superintendent. Roosevelt Park was expanded to 37 homes with 58 people by 1959.

Societies and clubs
Morrison was an active member in the Soroptimist Club, the South Jersey Social Workers, Millville Red Cross, Eastern Star, Horticultural Society and Woman's Club of New Jersey.

Awards and honors 

Morrison in 1949 was named Millville's citizen of the year by the city's Board of Trade.  She was awarded in 1950 a plaque at the New York convention of Soroptimists for her civic work. Morrison was a winner of the 'South Jersey Woman of the Year' award for 1951 for work with the elderly. She was chosen as "Woman of the Year" by the New Jersey State Federation of Women's Clubs in 1951. She received in 1952 the Cecilia Gaines Holland Award for founding the Roosevelt Park as a retirement community.

Later life and death 
Morrison died of a stroke at the age of 81 at Zurbrugg Hospital in Riverside, New Jersey, on March 29, 1957. She is buried at the Lakeview Memorial Park cemetery in Cinnaminson, New Jersey.

References

Sources

1876 births
1957 deaths
People from Millville, New Jersey
American social workers
Elder rights activists
Real estate and property developers
Housing for the elderly in the United States
Social workers
People from Monson, Massachusetts
19th-century American women
20th-century American women
20th-century American people